Sheila Mathews Allen (born Sheila Marie Mathews, February 2, 1929 – November 15, 2013) was an American actress and producer.

Life and career
Allen was born in New York City to Christopher Joseph and Elizabeth (née McCloskey) Mathews, both immigrants from Ireland. She was married to producer Irwin Allen until his death in 1991. She appeared in several of her husband's TV series and movies through to 1986. Appearances include City Beneath the Sea, Lost in Space, Land of the Giants, The Poseidon Adventure and The Towering Inferno. Following his death in 1991 she remained on the board of Irwin Allen Productions. She also served as a producer on the 2002 television remake of The Time Tunnel and as Executive Producer of the film Poseidon in 2006.

Death
She died on November 15, 2013, at her home in Malibu, California, after an extended battle with pulmonary fibrosis.

Filmography

Television

 Voyage to the Bottom of the Sea (1964, 1 episode) as Mrs. Melton
 Lost in Space (1965-1968, 3 episodes) as Aunt Gamma / Brynhilda / Ruth Templeton
 The Time Tunnel, (1966-1967, TV series) as Producer
 Land of the Giants (1969-1970, 2 episodes) as Miss Collier, Nurse Helg, respectively
 City Beneath the Sea (1971, TV movie) as Blonde Woman
 The Waltons (1976-1978, 5 episodes) as Fanny Tatum
 Alice in Wonderland (1985, TV movie) as Alice's Mother
 Outrage! (1986, TV movie) as Mrs. Delehanty

References

External links

1929 births
2013 deaths
Film producers from New York (state)
Actresses from New York City
American television actresses
20th-century American actresses
American film actresses
Deaths from pulmonary fibrosis
American people of Irish descent
American women film producers
21st-century American women